Peter Allan Graves (born 6 June 1966), is a British former professional Grand Prix motorcycle road racer.

Early life
Graves was born in Hampstead, London, UK. He attended Hampton School before starting a racing career which spanned the years from 1984 to 1999.

Career
Racing series including the Grand Prix world championship in 1992 riding a Harris-Yamaha.  He competed in the 1994 Endurance World Championship for team Phase One Endurance at Spa-Francorchamps, and for several years the British Superbike Championship. He was winner of a number of British Championship events.

Team Manager
In the 1993 as well as racing a Ducati 888 in British Superbike he fielded a team in the Grand Prix for riders Simon Crafar and David Jefferies.

Leukaemia
In July 1997 Graves was diagnosed with Leukaemia and sat out the remainder of the racing season while undergoing Chemotherapy at Cheltenham General Hospital and Hammersmith Hospital. In 1998 he returned to the British Superbike Championship and won the 'Privateers Cup' on his first race back at Brands Hatch.

Grand Prix career statistics 

Points system in 1992:

(key) (Races in bold indicate pole position; races in italics indicate fastest lap)

References

External links
 superbikeracing.co.uk Official racing website, not updated since the end of 1999.
 channeldigital.co.uk Business Website.
 

English motorcycle racers
British motorcycle racers
Place of birth missing (living people)
500cc World Championship riders
British Superbike Championship riders
1966 births
Living people
People from Teddington
Sportspeople from London